This is a list of the first minority male lawyer(s) and judge(s) in Massachusetts. It includes the year in which the men were admitted to practice law (in parentheses). Also included are men who achieved other distinctions such becoming the first in their state to graduate from law school or become a political figure.

Firsts in state history

Law School 

 First African American male law graduate: George Lewis Ruffin (1869) in 1869

Lawyers 

 First African American male: Macon Bolling Allen in 1845) 
 First Chinese American male: Harry Dow in 1929 
 First Greek-born male: James Liacos 
 First undocumented male: Antonio Massa Viana around 2016

State judges 

 First African American male (justice of the peace): Macon Bolling Allen in 1847 
 First African American male (judge): George Lewis Ruffin (1869) in 1883  
 First African American male (superior court): Edward Gourdin in 1958  
 First Syrian Lebanese American male: Elias Shamon during the 1960s 
 First Hispanic American male (Cuban American): Charles A. Grabau (1974) from 1979-1985  
 First Asian American male: Richard J. Chin (1974) from 1989-1993  
 First openly LGBT male: Dermot Meagher from 1989-2006  
 First African American male (Presiding Judge; district court): Elwood S. McKenney 
 First Greek American male (Chief Justice; Supreme Judicial Court of Massachusetts): Paul J. Liacos in 1989 
 First African American male (Justice; Chief Justice of the Supreme Judicial Court of Massachusetts): Roderick L. Ireland (1975) in 1997 and 2000 respectively 
 First Portuguese American male (Massachusetts Appeals Court): Phillip Rapoza in 1998 
 First Albanian American male: Robert N. Tochka in 2014 
 First Armenian American male (Massachusetts Superior Court): Raffi Yessayan in 2015 
 First Indian American male (Massachusetts Housing Court): Neil Sherring in 2018

Attorney General of Massachusetts 

 First African American male: Edward Brooke (1948) in 1962

Assistant Attorney General of Massachusetts 

 First African American male: David S. Nelson in 1971  t

Massachusetts Bar Association 

First African American male (president): Wayne Budd from 1979-1980  
First openly LGBT male (president): Mark Mason in 2006  
First Hispanic American male (president): Robert Harnais in 2015

Firsts in local history 
 Isaac Borenstein: First Latino American male to serve as a Judge of the Lawrence District Court (1986) [Essex County, Massachusetts]
 José Ángel Navarro III: First Latino male to graduate from Harvard Law School [Middlesex County, Massachusetts]
 George Lewis Ruffin (1869): First African American male to graduate from Harvard Law School [Middlesex County, Massachusetts]
John Ward: First openly LGBT male lawyer in Boston, Massachusetts (1977) [Suffolk County, Massachusetts]
Ronald S. Sullivan, Jr. (1994): First African American male to serve as a faculty dean at Harvard University [Middlesex County, Massachusetts]
Ralph C. Martin, Jr.: First African American male to serve as the District Attorney for Middlesex County, Massachusetts (1992-2002)
Andrew Manual Crespo: First Latino American male to serve as the President of the Harvard Law Review [Cambridge, Middlesex County, Massachusetts]
Takeo Kikuchi (1877): First Japanese male to graduate from the Boston University School of Law. He would later co-found Chuo University in Tokyo, Japan. [Suffolk County, Massachusetts]
 Emanuel Hewlett (1877): First African American male to graduate from the Boston University School of Law [Suffolk County, Massachusetts]
Harry Elam (1951): First African American male appointed as a Judge of the Boston Municipal Court (1971) [Suffolk County, Massachusetts]
David Hall: First African American male to serve as the Dean of Northeastern University School of Law (1993)

See also 

 List of first minority male lawyers and judges in the United States
Boston Municipal Court

Other topics of interest 

 List of first women lawyers and judges in the United States
 List of first women lawyers and judges in Massachusetts

References 

 
Minority, Massachusetts, first
Minority, Massachusetts, first
Legal history of Massachusetts
Lists of people from Massachusetts
Massachusetts lawyers